Spyder Games is an American television series that was broadcast on MTV from June 18 to September 20, 2001. MTV's second and last foray into the soap opera format following the run of the anthology series Undressed, the series was originally called Spyder Web in development.

Originally intended for a 3 pm time slot, Spyder Games ultimately debuted at 7 pm because of its racy content. The final episodes, originally scheduled to air during the week of September 10, 2001, were postponed by a week because of continuous news coverage of the September 11 attacks, which MTV aired. The last episode was written as a cliffhanger, but MTV did not pick the series up for a second season. With the decline of the format, as of 2021, Spyder Games is the last new American soap opera to debut on a traditional, non-streaming broadcast or cable TV network.

Origins
In December 1998, MTV Series Development approached novelist and television writer Christian McLaughlin and his writing partner Valerie Ahern about developing a soap opera targeting the network's 12- to 24-year-old demographic. According to McLaughlin, "We wanted to do for soaps what Scream had done for horror films.  That movie acknowledged and even spoofed the conventions and staples of slasher films while never forgetting it was one ... We wanted to distill everything people loved about soaps — the impossibly hot young characters and deliciously suspenseful melodrama — and eliminate all the things people hate: the glacial pace, the endless recaps and all that praying and crying." James Stanley and Diane Messina Stanley helped the show's creators by serving as Story Consultants before it debuted.

Synopsis
The show centers on a wealthy video game-producing family and the unexpected murder of the patriarch, Boris Carlisle, who is in control of the company. A widower with four children (Natalia, Dmitri, Ivan and Sasha), Carlisle exhibits an irrational and unconcealed hatred (for apparently misogynistic reasons) for daughter Natalia, the sole Carlisle child interested in the success of the family's video game business, the titular Spyder Games. Carlsle instead places all of his interest and value in Dmitri, the oldest son, while second son Ivan's sensitivity is rewarded with Carlisle's barely concealed contempt. Youngest son Sasha, a teen much younger than his siblings, is superficially indulged.

Dmitri becomes romantically involved with Daphne, a fashion designer, but through mistaken identity is deceived into having sex with Daphne's conniving employee Taylor. Concealing a trailer trash past while working secretly as a call girl, Taylor then supposedly becomes pregnant with Dmitri's child. Ivan marries Julie Whitmore, the daughter of another wealthy local businessman, but then reveals he is gay as he is undeniably attracted to Francisco, a male houseguest in the Carlisles' home and one-time flame of Natalia's. Sasha pursues a career as a serious musician but is frustrated at being typecast as a teen idol in the style of Aaron Carter; indifferent and easily distracted, he breaks the heart of Cherish, a high school classmate with a hard crush on him who is also his most loyal fan. Meanwhile, Natalia struggles to conduct business at Spyder Games, constantly opposed and undermined by her father, who demonstrates many unscrupulous behaviors, both personal and professional. A host of additional characters move in and out of the Carlisles' dealings, including private investigator Jeff Northcutt, Taylor's ex-convict brother Lyle and Natalia's creepily devoted lackey Todd. Eventually Sasha is revealed to be Natalia's son instead of brother, fathered by Ivan's wife Julie's father when Natalia was about thirteen years old. As the episodes progress, a mysterious series of events lead to Boris' murder and the discovery of his severed head in a freezer.

Cast and characters
 Shawn Batten as Natalia Carlisle
 J.R. Cacia as Dmitri Carlisle
 Christina Chambers as Taylor Jones
 Megalyn Echikunwoke as Cherish Pardee
 Byron Field as Ivan Carlisle
 Monica Serene Garnich as Julie Whitmore Carlisle
 Robert Hutchinson as Sasha Carlisle
 Enrique Murciano as Francisco Torres
 Nectar Rose as Daphne Wallace
 Bryce Mouer as Lyle Jones
 Zay Harding as Jeff Northcutt
 Alisa Reyes as Rocio Conejo

Reception
Spyder Games was criticized for numerous reasons, not the least of which were visibly impoverished production values and questionable quality of acting performances.

References

External links
 
 Spyder Games Behind the Scenes - ChristianLaughlin.com

American television soap operas
MTV original programming
MTV weekday shows
2001 American television series debuts
2001 American television series endings
2000s American drama television series
English-language television shows
Television series about dysfunctional families